Aai Kuthe Kay Karte! is an Indian Marathi language drama which airs on Star Pravah. It is based on the Bengali series Sreemoyee on Star Jalsha. The show premiered on 23 December 2019 and stars Madhurani Gokhale Prabhulkar in the titular role of Arundhati. It is also digitally available on Disney+ Hotstar. The show is produced by Rajan Shahi's Director's Kut Productions.

Plot 
A middle-aged housewife, Arundhati, has dedicated her life to her husband and children. Her husband Anirudh has an affair with his colleague, Sanjana. Arundhati's elder son, Abhishek marries Ankita while Arundhati's younger son, Yash falls in love with Sanjana's niece, Gauri.

Arundhati's friend, Devika tells her that her family is taking her for granted. The family plans a remarriage of Arundhati and Anirudh, to mark their 25th anniversary. Sanjana tries to marry Anirudh on his wedding day with Arundhati, but in vain. In anger, she comes to tell Arundhati the truth about her and Anirudh's affair on their wedding day. However, Anirudh stops her and expresses his love towards her in his bedroom and Arundhati sees. Arundhati breaks down and decides to retaliate against Anirudh for his betrayal.

Arundhati changes herself and learns all the things that she remained to learn. Soon, Anirudh and Sanjana's relationship is exposed to the Deshmukh family, while Anirudh proposes to Sanjana on her birthday. The Deshmukhs blame on Anirudh, who later moves to Sanjana's house. Later, Arundhati's daughter, Isha becomes depressed, which makes Anirudh to return his family.

Anirudh and Arundhati finally get divorced. Sanjana divorces Shekhar and marries Anirudh. Sanjana continuously taunts Arundhati, trying to humiliate her and fails in her attempts to turn the family against her. Arundhati's college friend, Ashutosh, enters and gives Arundhati moral support. Abhishek divorces Ankita and decides to marry his fiancée, Anagha. But before their marriage Anagha's obsessive lover, Girish, arrives and disrupts their lives even attempting Yash, Abhishek and Arundhati's murders but is caught in the act by Ashutosh. The couple gets married. Later Arundhati leaves the Samridhhi Mansion due to repetitive character assassination by Kanchan, Aniruddh, Abhishek and Sanjana while Yash also decides to leave with her. They move to a rented house while Sanjana tricks everyone into signing property papers on her name.

This action of Sanjana causes a lot of rift in her and Anirudh's relationship.  Anirudh wants to divorce Sanjana, but he is unable to do so.  Anirudh's true face comes out to Sanjana, while the Deshmukh family stands firmly behind Sanjana.  And Sanjana realizes her mistakes, she supports Arundhati.

Later Anagha gets pregnant and gives birth to a girl whom the family name Janaki("Chakuli").The family learns about Abhishek's extra marital affair but forgive him later when he reforms himself. Isha and Abhishek's nephew Anish fall in love.Arundhati and Ashutosh realise their love for each other and decide to get married. Anirudh tries everything to break Arundhati's marriage,But all his efforts go in vain and finally Arundhati and Ashutosh get married happily.

Cast

Main
 Madhurani Gokhale-Prabhulkar as Arundhati Kelkar (nee:Joglekar;formerly:Deshmukh) – Vidya's daughter; Sudhir's sister; Aniruddh's ex-wife; Ashutosh's wife; Abhishek, Yash and Isha's mother; Janaki's grandmother (2019–present)
 Omkar Govardhan as Ashutosh Kelkar – Sulekha's son; Arundhati's husband. (2021–present)
 Milind Gawali as Aniruddh Deshmukh – Vinayak and Kanchan's elder son; Vishaka and Avinash's brother; Arundhati's ex-husband; Sanjana's husband; Abhishek, Yash and Isha's father; Janaki's grandfather (2019–present)
 Deepali Pansare as Sanjana Deshmukh – Rajni's sister; Shekar's ex-wife; Aniruddh's wife; Nikhil's mother; Gauri's aunt (2019-2020)
 Rupali Bhosale replaced Deepali as Sanjana Deshmukh (2020–present)

Recurring 
 Abhishek Deshmukh as Yash Deshmukh – Arundhati and Aniruddh's younger son; Abhishek and Isha's brother; Gauri's love interest (2019–present)
 Gauri Kulkarni as Gauri Karkhanis – Rajni's daughter; Sanjana's niece; Yash's love interest (2020–present)
 Ashwini Mahangade as Anagha Deshmukh – Asha and Pradeep's daughter; Abhishek's wife; Janaki's mother (2020–present)
 Niranjan Kulkarni as Dr. Abhishek "Abhi" Deshmukh – Arundhati and Aniruddh's elder son; Yash and Isha's brother; Ankita's ex-husband; Anagha's husband; Janaki's father (2019–present)
 Apurva Gore as Isha Deshmukh – Arundhati and Aniruddh's daughter; Abhishek and Yash's sister; Anish's love interest (2019–present)
 Sumant Thakre as Anish Kelkar – Ashutosh's nephew; Isha's love interest (2022–present)
 Kishore Mahabole as Vinayak Deshmukh – Kanchan's husband; Aniruddh, Vishaka and Avinash's father; Abhishek, Yash and Isha's grandfather; Janaki's great-grandfather (2019–present)
 Archana Patkar as Kanchan Deshmukh – Tatya and Sulu's sister; Vinayak's wife; Aniruddh, Vishaka and Avinash's mother; Abhishek, Yash and Isha's grandmother; Janaki's great-grandmother (2019–present)
 Twisha Ayare as Janaki "Chakuli" Deshmukh – Anagha and Abhishek's daughter (2022–present)
 Poonam Chandokar as Vishakha Deshmukh – Vinayak and Kanchan's daughter; Aniruddh and Avinash's sister; Kedar's wife (2020–present)
 Ashish Kulkarni as Kedar – Vishaka's husband (2020–present)
 Shantanu Moghe as Avinash Deshmukh – Vinayak and Kanchan's younger son; Vishakha and Aniruddh's brother; Nilima's husband (2021–2022)
 Sheetal Kshirsagar as Nilima Deshmukh – Avinash's wife (2020–2021)

Others
 Ila Bhate as Sulekha Kelkar – Ashutosh's mother (2021–present)
 Rasikraj as Nitin Shah – Arundhati and Ashutosh's business partner (2021–present)
 Seema Ghogale as Vimal – Deshmukh's domestic help (2019–present)
 Radha Kulkarni as Dr.Ankita Kulkarni – Revati and Pramod's daughter; Abhishek's ex-fiancé (2019–2022)
 Advait Kadane as Sahil Salvi – Isha's ex-fiancé (2020–2022)
 Medha Jambotkar as Vidya Joglekar – Arundhati and Sudhir's mother; Abhishek, Yash and Isha's grandmother (2019–present)
 Kedar Shirsekar as Sudhir Joglekar – Vidya's son; Arundhati's brother (2020–present)
 Mayur Khandage as Shekhar Dixit – Sanjana's former husband; Nikhil's father; Gauri's uncle (2020–2022)
 Unknown as Nikhil Dixit – Sanjana and Shekhar's son, Gauri's cousin (2020–present)
 Sushma Murudekar as Rajni Karkhanis – Sanjana's sister; Gauri's mother (2020–2021)
 Pooja Pawar Salunkhe / Reshma Polekar as Dr.Revati Pramod Kulkarni – Pramod's wife; Ankita's mother (2019–2020)
 Sanjay Shemkalyani as Dr.Pramod Kulkarni – Revati's husband; Ankita's father (2019–2020)
 Radhika Deshpande as Devika – Arundhati's best friend (2020–present)
 Ragini Samant as Sulu – Kanchan and Tatya's sister (2019–2020)
 Jayant Savarkar as Tatya – Kanchan and Sulu's brother (2020)
 Mugdha Godbole Ranade as Dr. Vasudha Sardesai – Arundhati's gynecologist; Abhi's senior doctor (2020–present)
 Swarangi Marathe as Anushka – Ashutosh's friend (2022–present)

Cameo appearance
 Nilesh Moharir as himself. He recorded Arundhati's first commercial song produced by Ashutosh (2022)

Production

Development
Rajan Shahi, who produces the series, decided to remake it in Hindi as Anupamaa for StarPlus stating, "This interesting concept around a mother's journey has been so inspirational that Star wants to bring it in Hindi too."

The production and broadcasting of the series was halted in late March 2020 due to the COVID-19 pandemic in India. After more than 3 months, the filming resumed in late June 2020 and the broadcast resumed on 13 July 2020. On 13 April 2021, Chief Minister of Maharashtra, Uddhav Thackeray announced a sudden curfew due to increased Covid cases, while the production halted from 14 April 2021 in Mumbai. Hence, the production location was soon shifted temporarily to Silvassa.

Casting
Madhurani Gokhale-Prabhulkar is cast as the lead role. Milind Gawali, Gauri Kulkarni, Deepali Pansare, Rupali Bhosale, Mayur Khandage, Kishore Mahabole, Archana Patkar, Poonam Chandokar, Apurva Gore, Seema Ghogale, Abhishek Deshmukh, Niranjan Kulkarni, Ashish Kulkarni and Radha Kulkarni were also cast. It was post COVID-19 pandemic lockdown when production resumed in June 2020. Deepali Pansare quit the series because of the pandemic and was replaced by Rupali Bhosale. In November 2021, Omkar Govardhan entered the show as the new main lead Ashutosh Kelkar.

Reception
The show became one of the most watched Indian Marathi television programs.

Ratings

Mahaepisode (1 hour) 
 19–26 January 2020 (Mahasaptah)
 16 August 2020
 8 November 2020
 13 December 2020
 24 January 2021
 28 February 2021
 28 March 2021
 11 July 2021
 19 September 2021
 31 October 2021
 12 December 2021
 20 March 2022
 26 June 2022
 14 August 2022
 25 September 2022
 20 November 2022
 18 December 2022
 22 January 2023
 26 February 2023

Soundtrack 

The lyrics of both versions of the title song are penned by Guru Thakur Music. Shripad Joshi penned the lyrics of the song Sobatis Halke.

Adaptations 
Star Pravah's Aai Kuthe Kay Karte! is an official Marathi remake of Star Jalsha's Sreemoyee.

References

External links 
 Aai Kuthe Kay Karte! at Disney+ Hotstar
 

Marathi-language television shows
2019 Indian television series debuts
Star Pravah original programming